Belomestnoye is a rural locality (a selo) and the administrative center of Belomestnenskoye Rural Settlement, Novooskolsky District, Belgorod Oblast, Russia. The population was 1,091 as of 2010. There are 10 streets.

Geography 
Belomestnoye is located 17 km southwest of Novy Oskol (the district's administrative centre) by road. Yendovino is the nearest rural locality.

References 

Rural localities in Novooskolsky District